The 2022 season was Sunrisers' third season, in which competed in the 50 over Rachael Heyhoe Flint Trophy and the Twenty20 Charlotte Edwards Cup. In the Charlotte Edwards Cup, the side finished bottom of Group A, losing all six of their six matches. In the Rachael Heyhoe Flint Trophy, the side finished bottom of the group, losing six of their seven matches, with the other cancelled.
 
The side was captained by Kelly Castle in all formats, retaining the captaincy in the Charlotte Edwards Cup whilst also replacing Amara Carr as captain in the Rachael Heyhoe Flint Trophy. Laura Marsh coached the side, replacing Trevor Griffin on an interim basis for the season. They played four home matches at the County Ground, Chelmsford and two at the County Ground, Northampton.

Squad

Changes
On 29 October 2021, it was announced that Grace Scrivens had been awarded a professional contract with the side, having previously been on a temporary contract. On 25 November 2021, it was announced that Fran Wilson had left the side, joining Western Storm. On 30 March 2022, the side announced the signing of Abtaha Maqsood until the end of July. In April 2022, Kelly Castle became all-format captain of the side (previously, Castle had captained the side in the Charlotte Edwards Cup whilst Amara Carr captained in the Rachael Heyhoe Flint Trophy) and Trevor Griffin stepped down from his role as head coach for personal reasons. Laura Marsh was announced as Griffin's replacement on an interim basis for the 2022 season. On 11 May 2022, it was announced by Lightning that they had signed Katie Midwood from Sunrisers. Sunrisers announced their 17-player squad for the season on 12 May 2022, confirming the addition of Jodi Grewcock and Scarlett Hughes, and the departure of Emily Thorpe, Katie Wolfe and Emily Woodhouse. Jessica Olorenshaw was promoted from the Academy squad to the senior squad on 8 July 2022.

Squad list
 Age given is at the start of Sunrisers' first match of the season (14 May 2022).

Charlotte Edwards Cup

Group A

 advanced to the semi-final

Fixtures

Tournament statistics

Batting

Source: ESPN Cricinfo Qualification: 50 runs.

Bowling

Source: ESPN Cricinfo Qualification: 5 wickets.

Rachael Heyhoe Flint Trophy

Season standings

 advanced to final
 advanced to the play-off

Fixtures

Tournament statistics

Batting

Source: ESPN Cricinfo Qualification: 100 runs.

Bowling

Source: ESPN Cricinfo Qualification: 5 wickets.

Season statistics

Batting

Bowling

Fielding

Wicket-keeping

References

Sunrisers (women's cricket) seasons
2022 in English women's cricket